Paul Rosenthal may refer to:

 Paul Rosenthal (Colorado politician), member of the Colorado House of Representatives
 Paul Rosenthal (Minnesota politician) (born 1960), member of the Minnesota House of Representatives
 Paul Rosenthal (violinist) (born 1942), American violinist